The Visual Effects Society Award for Outstanding Compositing in a Photoreal Feature is one of the annual awards given by the Visual Effects Society, starting in 2002. It is awarded to visual effects artists for their work in compositing.

Winners and nominees

2000s

2010s

2020s

Superlatives

Films with Multiple Nominations

2 Nominations
 Avatar
 Dune
 Iron Man 3
 Pirates of the Caribbean: At World's End

External links
 Visual Effects Society

References

C
Awards established in 2002